Henry McDaniel may refer to:

 Henry Dickerson McDaniel (1836–1926), governor of Georgia
 Henry E McDaniel (1906–2008), watercolor artist
 Henry McDaniel (racehorse trainer) (1867–1948)